The Brighton Dome Studio Theatre (formerly the Pavilion Theatre) is a theatre in Brighton, England. It is part of the wider Brighton Dome complex of buildings. It was built in 1935, originally as a supper room, but later converted into a theatre. Its audience capacity is 232 seated or 350 standing.

See also
Grade II listed buildings in Brighton and Hove: P–R

External links
 
 Official site

Theatres in Brighton and Hove
Grade II listed buildings in Brighton and Hove